Hôtel Métropole is a hotel in Matadi, Democratic Republic of Congo. Constructed in a Gothic Revival style by Belgian architect Ernest Callebout, it first opened in 1930.

References 

Matadi
Hotels in the Democratic Republic of the Congo